Thanh Ba is a township (thị trấn) and capital of Thanh Ba District, Phú Thọ Province, Vietnam.

References

Populated places in Phú Thọ province
Communes of Phú Thọ province
District capitals in Vietnam
Townships in Vietnam